The Feroz Award for Best Comedy Series (Spanish: Premio Feroz a la mejor serie de comedia) is one of the annual awards given at the Feroz Awards, presented by the Asociación de Informadores Cinematográficos de España. It was first presented in 2017, in that year, the Feroz Awards began presenting television categories, prior to that, only film categories were presented.

Winners and nominees

2010s

2020s

References

External links
 Official website

Feroz Awards
Awards established in 2017
2017 establishments in Spain